Colias leechi is a very little known butterfly in the family Pieridae. It was described from the East Palearctic  "In ramificationibus occidentalibus montium Himalayensium in valle Chonging" ( altitude).

Chongqing covers a large area crisscrossed by rivers and mountains. None are high enough to fit the description and Röber gives Sikkim as the locality and the British Museum card gives the type locality as West Himalaya Ladak.

Taxonomy
Described as a variety of  Colias eogene. The Global Lepidoptera Names Index treats leechi as Colias staudingeri ssp. leechi.  
Accepted as a species by  Josef Grieshuber & Gerardo Lamas

References

Butterflies described in 1893
leechi